Der Postmeister (English:  The Postmaster or The Stationmaster) is a 1940 Austrian-German film directed by Gustav Ucicky.  Released during the Molotov–Ribbentrop Pact, it depicts Russians in a sympathetic light, unlike their depiction in such films as Frisians in Peril before or GPU after. It was very loosely based on The Station Master, an 1831 short story from The Belkin Tales series by Alexander Pushkin. It was remade in 1955 as Dunja. An earlier version was the French film Nostalgie (1938) with Harry Baur, directed by Victor Tourjansky.

The film's sets were designed by the art directors Kurt Herlth and Werner Schlichting. It was made in German-occupied Austria by the Wien Film company, and distributed by the UFA concern.

At the Venice Film Festival, Der Postmeister won the Mussolini Cup for best foreign film.

Plot
The daughter of a stationmaster falls in love with a cavalry captain.  He persuades her to run away with him to St. Petersburg, but she realizes there that he never intended to marry her.

Cast 
 Heinrich George as Der Postmeister
 Hilde Krahl as Dunja
 Siegfried Breuer as Rittmeister Minskij
 Hans Holt as Fähnrich Mitja
 Ruth Hellberg as Elisawetha
 Margit Symo as Mascha
 Erik Frey as Sergej
 Alfred Neugebauer as Gutsbesitzer
 Franz Pfaudler as Knecht Pjotr
 Leo Peukert as Oberst
 Reinhold Häussermann as Schneider
 Auguste Pünkösdy as Wirobowa

See also
 The Stationmaster (1925)

References

External links
 
 Der Postmeister Full movie at the Deutsche Filmothek

Nazi propaganda films
1941 films
1940s historical films
German historical films
Films of Nazi Germany
1940s German-language films
Films directed by Gustav Ucicky
Films set in Russia
Films set in the 19th century
Films based on works by Aleksandr Pushkin
UFA GmbH films
German black-and-white films
Films set in Saint Petersburg
1940s German films